Six ships of the Royal Navy have been named HMS Bacchante, from "Bacchante" – the name for a priestess of the Roman god Bacchus. Yet another ship of this name was ordered but later cancelled.

Sold in 1809.
  – 38-gun fifth rate launched in 1811 at Deptford. She was converted to harbour service in 1837 and scrapped in 1858.
 HMS Bacchante – a wood screw frigate ordered from Portsmouth Dockyard in 1849 but cancelled in 1851.
  – a wood screw frigate launched in 1859 at Portsmouth Dockyard. She was broken up in 1869.
  –  launched 19 October 1876, sold 1897
  –  armoured cruiser launched in 1901 and sold for scrap in 1920.
  - Aberdeen, Scotland during First and Second World Wars
  –  launched in 1968 and sold to New Zealand in 1982.

Battle honours
Ships named Bacchante have earned the following battle honours:
Cattaro 1814
Heligoland 1914
Dardanelles 1915–16

References

Royal Navy ship names